A Crime Has Been Committed (French:Un crime a été commis) is a 1919 French silent film directed by André Hugon.

References

Bibliography
 Dayna Oscherwitz & MaryEllen Higgins. The A to Z of French Cinema. Scarecrow Press, 2009.

External links

1919 films
Films directed by André Hugon
French silent films
French black-and-white films
1910s French films